Rosetta was a space probe built by the European Space Agency launched on 2 March 2004. Along with Philae, its lander module, Rosetta performed a detailed study of comet 67P/Churyumov–Gerasimenko (67P). During its journey to the comet, the spacecraft performed flybys of Earth, Mars, and the asteroids 21 Lutetia and 2867 Šteins. It was launched as the third cornerstone mission of the ESA's Horizon 2000 programme, after SOHOCluster and XMM-Newton.

On 12 November, its lander module Philae performed the first successful landing on a comet, though its battery power ran out two days later. Communications with Philae were briefly restored in June and July 2015, but due to diminishing solar power, Rosetta communications module with the lander was turned off on 27 July 2016. On 30 September 2016, the Rosetta spacecraft ended its mission by hard-landing on the comet in its Ma'at region.

The probe was named after the Rosetta Stone, a stele of Egyptian origin featuring a decree in three scripts. The lander was named after the Philae obelisk, which bears a bilingual Greek and Egyptian hieroglyphic inscription.

Mission overview 

Rosetta was launched on 2 March 2004 from the Guiana Space Centre in Kourou, French Guiana, on an Ariane 5 rocket and reached Comet Churyumov–Gerasimenko on 7 May 2014. It performed a series of manoeuvres to enter orbit between then and 6 August 2014, when it became the first spacecraft to orbit a comet. (Previous missions had conducted successful flybys of seven other comets.) It was one of ESA's Horizon 2000 cornerstone missions. The spacecraft consisted of the Rosetta orbiter, which featured 12 instruments, and the Philae lander, with nine additional instruments. The Rosetta mission orbited Comet Churyumov–Gerasimenko for 17 months and was designed to complete the most detailed study of a comet ever attempted. The spacecraft was controlled from the European Space Operations Centre (ESOC), in Darmstadt, Germany. The planning for the operation of the scientific payload, together with the data retrieval, calibration, archiving and distribution, was performed from the European Space Astronomy Centre (ESAC), in Villanueva de la Cañada, near Madrid, Spain. It has been estimated that in the decade preceding 2014, some 2,000 people assisted in the mission in some capacity.

In 2007, Rosetta made a Mars gravity assist (flyby) on its way to Comet Churyumov–Gerasimenko. The spacecraft also performed two asteroid flybys. The craft completed its flyby of asteroid 2867 Šteins in September 2008 and of 21 Lutetia in July 2010. Later, on 20 January 2014, Rosetta was taken out of a 31-month hibernation mode as it approached Comet Churyumov–Gerasimenko.

Rosetta Philae lander successfully made the first soft landing on a comet nucleus when it touched down on Comet Churyumov–Gerasimenko on 12 November 2014. On 5 September 2016, ESA announced that the lander was discovered by the narrow-angle camera aboard Rosetta as the orbiter made a low,  pass over the comet. The lander sits on its side wedged into a dark crevice of the comet, explaining the lack of electrical power to establish proper communication with the orbiter.

History

Background 
During the 1986 approach of Halley's Comet, international space probes were sent to explore the comet, most prominent among them being ESA's Giotto. After the probes returned valuable scientific information, it became obvious that follow-ons were needed that would shed more light on cometary composition and answer new questions.

Both ESA and NASA started cooperatively developing new probes. The NASA project was the Comet Rendezvous Asteroid Flyby (CRAF) mission. The ESA project was the follow-on Comet Nucleus Sample Return (CNSR) mission. Both missions were to share the Mariner Mark II spacecraft design, thus minimising costs. In 1992, after NASA cancelled CRAF due to budgetary limitations, ESA decided to develop a CRAF-style project on its own. By 1993 it was evident that the ambitious sample return mission was infeasible with the existing ESA budget, so the mission was redesigned and subsequently approved by the ESA, with the final flight plan resembling the cancelled CRAF mission: an asteroid flyby followed by a comet rendezvous with in-situ examination, including a lander. After the spacecraft launch, Gerhard Schwehm was named mission manager; he retired in March 2014.

The Rosetta mission included generational team management; this allowed mission continuity over the long period of the mission and for special knowledge to be maintained and passed on to future team members. In particular, several younger scientists were brought on as principal science investigators, and regular training sessions were conducted.

Naming 
The probe was named after the Rosetta Stone, a stele of Egyptian origin featuring a decree in three scripts. The lander was named after the Philae obelisk, which bears a bilingual Greek and Egyptian hieroglyphic inscription. A comparison of its hieroglyphs with those on the Rosetta Stone catalysed the deciphering of the Egyptian writing system. Similarly, it was hoped that these spacecraft would result in better understanding of comets and the early Solar System. In a more direct analogy to its namesake, the Rosetta spacecraft also carried a micro-etched pure nickel prototype of the Rosetta disc donated by the Long Now Foundation. The disc was inscribed with 6,500 pages of language translations.

Mission firsts 

The Rosetta mission achieved many historic firsts.

On its way to comet 67P, Rosetta passed through the main asteroid belt, and made the first European close encounter with several of these primitive objects. Rosetta was the first spacecraft to fly close to Jupiter's orbit using solar cells as its main power source.

Rosetta was the first spacecraft to orbit a comet nucleus, and was the first spacecraft to fly alongside a comet as it headed towards the inner Solar System. It became the first spacecraft to examine at close proximity the activity of a frozen comet as it is warmed by the Sun. Shortly after its arrival at 67P, the Rosetta orbiter dispatched the Philae lander for the first controlled touchdown on a comet nucleus. The robotic lander's instruments obtained the first images from a comet's surface and made the first in situ analysis of its composition.

Design and construction 
The Rosetta bus was a  central frame and aluminium honeycomb platform. The Payload Support Module was mounted on top of the spacecraft and housed the scientific instruments, while the Bus Support Module was on the bottom and contained spacecraft support subsystems. Heaters placed around the spacecraft kept its systems warm while it was distant from the Sun. Rosetta communications suite included a  steerable high-gain parabolic dish antenna, a  fixed-position medium-gain antenna, and two omnidirectional low-gain antennas.

Electrical power for the spacecraft came from two solar arrays totalling . Each solar array was subdivided into five solar panels, with each panel being . The solar arrays generated a maximum of approximately 1,500 watts at perihelion, a minimum of 400 watts in hibernation mode at 5.2 AU, and 850 watts when comet operations begin at 3.4 AU. Spacecraft power was controlled by a redundant Terma power module also used in the Mars Express spacecraft, and was stored in four 10-A·h [Li-ion] batteries supplying 28 volts to the bus.

Main propulsion comprised 24 paired bipropellant 10 N thrusters, with four pairs of thrusters being used for delta-v burns.

Rosetta was built in a clean room according to COSPAR rules, but "sterilisation  generally not crucial since comets are usually regarded as objects where you can find prebiotic molecules, that is, molecules that are precursors of life, but not living microorganisms", according to Gerhard Schwehm, Rosetta project scientist. The total cost of the mission was about €1.3 billion (US$1.8 billion).

Launch 

Rosetta was set to be launched on 12 January 2003 to rendezvous with the comet 46P/Wirtanen in 2011. This plan was abandoned after the failure of an Ariane 5 ECA carrier rocket during Hot Bird 7's launch on 11 December 2002, grounding it until the cause of the failure could be determined. In May 2003, a new plan was formed to target the comet 67P/Churyumov–Gerasimenko, with a revised launch date of 26 February 2004 and comet rendezvous in 2014. The larger mass and the resulting increased impact velocity made modification of the landing gear necessary.

After two scrubbed launch attempts, Rosetta was launched on 2 March 2004 at 07:17 UTC from the Guiana Space Centre in French Guiana, using Ariane 5 G+ carrier rocket. Aside from the changes made to launch time and target, the mission profile remained almost identical. Both co-discoverers of the comet, Klim Churyumov and Svetlana Gerasimenko, were present at the spaceport during the launch.

Deep space manoeuvres 
To achieve the required velocity to rendezvous with 67P, Rosetta used gravity assist manoeuvres to accelerate throughout the inner Solar System.

The first Earth flyby was on 4 March 2005.

On 25 February 2007, the craft was scheduled for a low-altitude flyby of Mars, to correct the trajectory. This was not without risk, as the estimated altitude of the flyby was a mere . During that encounter, the solar panels could not be used since the craft was in the planet's shadow, where it would not receive any solar light for 15 minutes, causing a dangerous shortage of power. The craft was therefore put into standby mode, with no possibility to communicate, flying on batteries that were originally not designed for this task. This Mars manoeuvre was therefore nicknamed "The Billion Euro Gamble". The flyby was successful, with Rosetta even returning detailed images of the surface and atmosphere of the planet, and the mission continued as planned.

Calculations showed that it would pass very close to Earth, which led to speculation that it could impact Earth. However, astronomer Denis Denisenko recognised that the trajectory matched that of Rosetta, which the Minor Planet Center confirmed in an editorial release on 9 November.

The spacecraft performed a close flyby of asteroid 2867 Šteins on 5 September 2008. Onboard instruments measured the asteroid from 4 August to 10 September.

The 462 images were obtained in 21 narrow- and broad-band filters extending from 0.24 to 1 μm. Lutetia was also observed by the visible–near-infrared imaging spectrometer VIRTIS, and measurements of the magnetic field and plasma environment were taken as well.

After leaving its hibernation mode in January 2014 and getting closer to the comet, Rosetta began a series of eight burns in May 2014.

Reaction control system problems 
In 2006, Rosetta suffered a leak in its reaction control system (RCS). The system, which consists of 24 bipropellant 10-newton thrusters, was responsible for fine tuning the trajectory of Rosetta throughout its journey. The RCS operated at a lower pressure than designed due to the leak. While this may have caused the propellants to mix incompletely and burn 'dirtier' and less efficiently, ESA engineers were confident that the spacecraft would have sufficient fuel reserves to allow for the successful completion of the mission.

Prior to Rosetta deep space hibernation period, two of the spacecraft's four reaction wheels began exhibiting increased levels of "bearing friction noise". Increased friction levels in Reaction Wheel Assembly (RWA) B were noted after its September 2008 encounter with asteroid Šteins. Two attempts were made to relubricate the RWA using an on-board oil reservoir, but in each case noise levels were only temporarily lowered, and the RWA was turned off in mid-2010 after the flyby of asteroid Lutetia to avoid possible failure. Shortly after this, RWA C also began showing evidence of elevated friction. Relubrication was also performed on this RWA, and methods were found to temporarily increase its operating temperature to better improve the transfer of oil from its reservoir. In addition, the reaction wheel's speed range was decreased to limit lifetime accumulated rotations. These changes resulted in RWA C performance stabilising.

During the spacecraft's Deep Space Hibernation flight phase, engineers performed ground testing on a flight spare RWA at the European Space Operations Centre. After Rosetta exited hibernation in January 2014, lessons learned from the ground testing were applied to all four RWAs, such as increasing their operating temperatures and limiting their wheel speeds to below 1000 rpm. After these fixes, the RWAs showed nearly identical performance data. Three RWAs were kept operational, while one of the malfunctioning RWAs was held in reserve. Additionally, new on-board software was developed to allow Rosetta to operate with only two active RWAs if necessary. These changes allowed the four RWAs to operate throughout Rosetta mission at 67P/Churyumov–Gerasimenko despite occasional anomalies in their friction plots and a heavy workload imposed by numerous orbital changes.

Orbit around 67P 

In August 2014, Rosetta rendezvoused with the comet 67P/Churyumov–Gerasimenko (67P) and commenced a series of manoeuvres that took it on two successive triangular paths, averaging  from the nucleus, whose segments are hyperbolic escape trajectories alternating with thruster burns.

The surface layout of 67P was unknown before Rosetta arrival. The orbiter mapped the comet in anticipation of detaching its lander. By 25 August 2014, five potential landing sites had been determined. On 15 September 2014, ESA announced Site J, named Agilkia in honour of Agilkia Island by an ESA public contest and located on the "head" of the comet, as the lander's destination.

Philae lander 

It initially landed on 67P at 15:33 UTC, but bounced twice, coming to rest at 17:33 UTC. Confirmation of contact with 67P reached Earth at 16:03 UTC.

After landing on the comet, Philae had been scheduled to commence its science mission, which included:
 Characterisation of the nucleus
 Determination of the chemical compounds present, including amino acid enantiomers
 Study of comet activities and developments over time

After bouncing, Philae settled in the shadow of a cliff, canted at an angle of around 30 degrees. This made it unable to adequately collect solar power, and it lost contact with Rosetta when its batteries ran out after three days, well before much of the planned science objectives could be attempted. Contact was briefly and intermittently reestablished several months later at various times between 13 June and 9 July, before contact was lost once again. There was no communication afterwards, and the transmitter to communicate with Philae was switched off in July 2016 to reduce power consumption of the probe. The precise location of the lander was discovered in September 2016 when Rosetta came closer to the comet and took high-resolution pictures of its surface. Knowing its exact location provides information needed to put Philae's two days of science into proper context.

Notable results 

Researchers expect the study of data gathered will continue for decades to come. One of the first discoveries was that the magnetic field of 67P oscillated at 40–50 millihertz. A German composer and sound designer created an artistic rendition from the measured data to make it audible. Although it is a natural phenomenon, it has been described as a "song" and has been compared to Continuum for harpsichord by György Ligeti. However, results from Philae landing show that the comet's nucleus has no magnetic field, and that the field originally detected by Rosetta is likely caused by the solar wind.

The isotopic signature of water vapour from comet 67P, as determined by the Rosetta spacecraft, is substantially different from that found on Earth. That is, the ratio of deuterium to hydrogen in the water from the comet was determined to be three times that found for terrestrial water. This makes it very unlikely that water found on Earth came from comets such as comet 67P, according to the scientists. On 22 January 2015, NASA reported that, between June and August 2014, the rate at which water vapour was released by the comet increased up to tenfold. 

End of mission 
As the orbit of comet 67P took it farther from the Sun, the amount of sunlight reaching Rosetta solar panels decreased. While it would have been possible to put Rosetta into a second hibernation phase during the comet's aphelion, there was no assurance that enough power would be available to run the spacecraft's heaters to keep it from freezing. To guarantee a maximum science return, mission managers made the decision to instead guide Rosetta down to the comet's surface and end the mission on impact, gathering photographs and instrument readings along the way. On 23 June 2015, at the same time as a mission extension was confirmed, ESA announced that end of mission would occur at the end of September 2016 after two years of operations at the comet.

Rosetta began a  descent with a 208-second thruster burn executed on 29 September 2016 at approximately 20:50 UTC. Its trajectory targeted a site in the Ma'at region near an area of dust- and gas-producing active pits.

Impact on the comet's surface occurred 14.5 hours after its descent manoeuvre; the final data packet from Rosetta was transmitted at 10:39:28.895 UTC (SCET) by the OSIRIS instrument and was received at the European Space Operations Centre in Darmstadt, Germany, at 11:19:36.541 UTC. Rosetta computer included commands to send it into safe mode upon detecting that it had hit the comet's surface, turning off its radio transmitter and rendering it inert in accordance with International Telecommunication Union rules.

On 28 September 2017, a previously unrecovered image taken by the spacecraft was reported. This image was recovered from three data packets discovered on a server after completion of the mission.

Instruments

Nucleus 
The investigation of the nucleus was done by three optical spectrometers, one microwave radio antenna and one radar:
 Alice (an ultraviolet imaging spectrograph). The ultraviolet spectrograph searched for and quantified the noble gas content in the comet nucleus, from which the temperature during the comet creation could be estimated. The detection was done by an array of potassium bromide and caesium iodide photocathodes. The  instrument used 2.9 watts, with an improved version onboard New Horizons. ALICE was built and operated by the Southwest Research Institute for NASA's Jet Propulsion Laboratory.
 OSIRIS (Optical, Spectroscopic, and Infrared Remote Imaging System). The camera system had a narrow-angle lens (700 mm) and a wide-angle lens (140 mm), with a 2048×2048 pixel CCD chip. The instrument was constructed in Germany. Development and construction of the instrument was led by the Max Planck Institute for Solar System Research (MPS).
 VIRTIS (Visible and Infrared Thermal Imaging Spectrometer). The Visible and IR spectrometer was able to make pictures of the nucleus in the IR and also search for IR spectra of molecules in the coma. The detection was done by a mercury cadmium telluride array for IR and with a CCD chip for the visible wavelength range. The instrument was produced in Italy, and improved versions were used for Dawn and Venus Express.
 MIRO (Microwave Instrument for the Rosetta Orbiter). The abundance and temperature of volatile substances like water, ammonia and carbon dioxide could be detected by MIRO via their microwave emissions. The  radio antenna along with the rest of the  instrument was built by NASA's Jet Propulsion Laboratory with international contributions by the Max Planck Institute for Solar System Research (MPS), among others.
 CONSERT (Comet Nucleus Sounding Experiment by Radiowave Transmission). The CONSERT experiment provided information about the deep interior of the comet using radar. The radar performed tomography of the nucleus by measuring electromagnetic wave propagation between the Philae lander and the Rosetta orbiter through the comet nucleus. This allowed it to determine the comet's internal structure and deduce information on its composition. The electronics were developed by France and both antennas were constructed in Germany. Development was led by the Laboratoire de Planétologie de Grenoble with contributions by the Ruhr-Universität Boch and the Max Planck Institute for Solar System Research (MPS).
RSI (Radio Science Investigation). RSI made use of the probe's communication system for physical investigation of the nucleus and the inner coma of the comet.

Gas and particles 
 ROSINA (Rosetta Orbiter Spectrometer for Ion and Neutral Analysis). The instrument consisted of a double-focus magnetic mass spectrometer (DFMS) and a reflectron type time of flight mass spectrometer (RTOF). The DFMS had a high resolution (could resolve N2 from CO) for molecules up to 300 amu. The RTOF was highly sensitive for neutral molecules and for ions. The Max Planck Institute for Solar System Research (MPS) has contributed to the development and construction of the instrument. ROSINA was developed at the University of Bern in Switzerland.
 MIDAS (Micro-Imaging Dust Analysis System). The high-resolution atomic force microscope investigated several physical aspects of the dust particles which are deposited on a silicon plate.
 COSIMA (Cometary Secondary Ion Mass Analyser). COSIMA analysed the composition of dust particles by secondary ion mass spectrometry, using indium ions. It could detect ions up to a mass of 6500 amu. COSIMA was built by the Max Planck Institute for Extraterrestrial Physics (MPE, Germany) with international contributions. The COSIMA team is led by the Max Planck Institute for Solar System Research (MPS, Germany).
 GIADA (Grain Impact Analyser and Dust Accumulator). GIADA analysed the dust environment of the comet coma by measuring the optical cross section, momentum, speed and mass of each grain entering inside the instrument.

Solar wind interaction 
 RPC (Rosetta Plasma Consortium).

Search for organic compounds 
Previous observations have shown that comets contain complex organic compounds. These are the elements that make up nucleic acids and amino acids, essential ingredients for life as we know it. Comets are thought to have delivered a vast quantity of water to Earth, and they may have also seeded Earth with organic molecules. Rosetta and Philae also searched for organic molecules, nucleic acids (the building blocks of DNA and RNA) and amino acids (the building blocks of proteins) by sampling and analysing the comet's nucleus and coma cloud of gas and dust, helping assess the contribution comets made to the beginnings of life on Earth. Before succumbing to falling power levels, Philae COSAC instrument was able to detect organic molecules in the comet's atmosphere.

Amino acids
Upon landing on the comet, Philae should have also tested some hypotheses as to why essential amino acids are almost all "left-handed", which refers to how the atoms arrange in orientation in relation to the carbon core of the molecule. Most asymmetrical molecules are oriented in approximately equal numbers of left- and right-handed configurations (chirality), and the primarily left-handed structure of essential amino acids used by living organisms is unique. One hypothesis that will be tested was proposed in 1983 by William A. Bonner and Edward Rubenstein, Stanford University professors emeritus of chemistry and medicine respectively. They conjectured that when spiralling radiation is generated from a supernova, the circular polarisation of that radiation could then destroy one type of "handed" molecules. The supernova could wipe out one type of molecules while also flinging the other surviving molecules into space, where they could eventually end up on a planet.

Preliminary results 

The mission has yielded a significant science return, collecting a wealth of data from the nucleus and its environment at various levels of cometary activity. The VIRTIS spectrometer on board the Rosetta spacecraft has provided evidence of nonvolatile organic macromolecular compounds everywhere on the surface of comet 67P with little to no water ice visible. Preliminary analyses strongly suggest the carbon is present as polyaromatic organic solids mixed with sulfides and iron-nickel alloys.

Solid organic compounds were also found in the dust particles emitted by the comet; the carbon in this organic material is bound in "very large macromolecular compounds", analogous to those found in carbonaceous chondrite meteorites. However, no hydrated minerals were detected, suggesting no link with carbonaceous chondrites.

In turn, the Philae lander's COSAC instrument detected organic molecules in the comet's atmosphere as it descended to its surface. Measurements by the COSAC and Ptolemy instruments on the Philae lander revealed sixteen organic compounds, four of which were seen for the first time on a comet, including acetamide, acetone, methyl isocyanate and propionaldehyde. The only amino acid detected thus far on the comet is glycine, along with the precursor molecules methylamine and ethylamine.

One of the most outstanding discoveries of the mission was the detection of large amounts of free molecular oxygen gas surrounding the comet. A local abundance of oxygen was reported to be in range from 1% to 10% relative to H2O.

Timeline of major events and discoveries 

2004
 2 March – Rosetta was successfully launched at 07:17 UTC (04:17 local time) from Kourou, French Guiana.

2005
 4 March – Rosetta executed its first planned close swing-by (gravity assist passage) of Earth. The Moon and the Earth's magnetic field were used to test and calibrate the instruments on board of the spacecraft.
 4 July – Imaging instruments on board observed the collision between the comet Tempel 1 and the impactor of the Deep Impact mission.

2007
 25 February – Mars flyby.
 8 November – Catalina Sky Survey briefly misidentified the Rosetta spacecraft, approaching for its second Earth flyby, as a newly discovered asteroid.

2008
 5 September – Flyby of asteroid 2867 Šteins.

2009

2010
 16 March – Observation of the dust tail of asteroid P/2010 A2. Together with observations by Hubble Space Telescope it could be confirmed that P/2010 A2 is not a comet, but an asteroid, and that the tail most likely consists of particles from an impact by a smaller asteroid.
 10 July – Flew by and photographed the asteroid 21 Lutetia.

2014
 May to July – Starting on 7 May, Rosetta began orbital correction manoeuvres to bring itself into orbit around 67P.
 14 July – The OSIRIS on-board imaging system returned images of comet 67P which confirmed the irregular shape of the comet.
Commences comet mapping and characterisation to determine a stable orbit and viable landing location for Philae.
 4 September – The first science data from Rosetta Alice instrument was reported, showing that the comet is unusually dark in ultraviolet wavelengths, hydrogen and oxygen are present in the coma, and no significant areas of water-ice have been found on the comet's surface. Water-ice was expected to be found as the comet is too far from the Sun to turn water into vapour.
 12 November 2014 – Philae lands on the surface of 67P.
 10 December 2014 – Data from the ROSINA mass spectrometers show that the ratio of heavy water to normal water on comet 67P is more than three times that on Earth. The ratio is regarded as a distinctive signature, and the discovery means that Earth's water is unlikely to have originated from comets like 67P.

2015
 14 April 2015 – Scientists report that the comet's nucleus has no magnetic field of its own.
 2 July 2015 – Scientists report that active pits, related to sinkhole collapses and possibly associated with outbursts, have been found on the comet.

 11 August 2015 – Scientists release images of a comet outburst that occurred on 29 July 2015.
 28 October 2015 – Scientists publish an article in Nature reporting high levels of molecular oxygen around 67P.
 November 2014 to December 2015 – Rosetta escorted the comet around the Sun and performed riskier investigations.

2016
 27 July 2016 – ESA switched off the Electrical Support System Processor Unit (ESS) aboard Rosetta, disabling any possibility of further communications with the Philae lander.
 2 September 2016 - Rosetta photographs the Philae lander for the first time after its landing, finding it wedged against a large overhang.
Although Philae sent back some data during its descent, Rosetta has more powerful and more varied sensors and instruments, offering the opportunity to get some very close-in science to complement the more distant remote sensing it has been doing. The orbiter descended more slowly than Philae did.

Public image

Once upon a time... cartoon 

As part of the European Space Agency's media campaign in support of the Rosetta mission, both the Rosetta and Philae spacecraft were given anthropomorphic personalities in an animated web series titled Once upon a time.... The series depicts various stages in the Rosetta mission, involving the personified Rosetta and Philae on "a classic road trip story into the depths of our universe", complemented with various visual gags presented in an educational context. Produced by animation studio Design & Data GmbH, the series was initially conceived by the ESA as a four-part fantasy-like series with a Sleeping Beauty theme that promoted community involvement in Rosettas wake up from hibernation in January 2014. After the success of the series, however, the ESA commissioned the studio to continue producing new episodes in the series throughout the course of the mission. A total of twelve videos in the series were produced from 2013 to 2016, with a 25-minute compilation of the series released in December 2016, after the end of the mission. In 2019, Design & Data adapted the series into a 26-minute planetarium show that was commissioned by the Swiss Museum of Transport, and solicited to eighteen planetariums across Europe, with an aim "to inspire the young generation to explore the universe."

The Rosetta and Philae characters featured in Once upon a time..., designed by ESA employee and cartoonist Carlo Palazzari, became a central part of public image of the Rosetta mission, appearing in promotional material for the mission such as posters and merchandise, and often credited as a major factor in the popularity of the mission among the public. ESA employees also role-played as the characters on Twitter throughout the course of the mission. The characters were inspired by the JAXA's "kawaii" characters, whom portrayed a number of their spacecraft, such as Hayabusa2 and Akatsuki, with distinct anime-like personalities. The script for each episode of the series is written by science communicators at the European Space Research and Technology Centre, who kept close with mission operators and the producers at Design & Data. Canonically, Rosetta and Philae are depicted as siblings, with Rosetta being the older sister, inspired by the spacecraft's feminine name, of Philae, her younger brother. The Giotto spacecraft is also depicted as the duo's grandfather, whereas others in the Halley Armada as well as NASA's Deep Impact and Stardust spacecraft are depicted as their cousins.

Ambition 
To promote the spacecraft's arrival at comet 67P/Churyumov–Gerasimenko and the landing of Philae in 2014, a short film was produced by the European Space Agency with Polish visual effects production company Platige Image. Titled Ambition, the film, shot in Iceland, stars Irish actor Aidan Gillen, known for his roles in Game of Thrones and The Wire, and Irish actress Aisling Franciosi, also of Game of Thrones fame, and was directed by Oscar-nominated Polish director Tomasz Bagiński. Set in the far future, Ambition centers around a discussion between a master, played by Gillen, discussing the importance of ambition with his apprentice, played by Franciosi, using the Rosetta mission as an example of such. Ambition was premiered at the British Film Institute's Sci-Fi: Days of Fear and Wonder film festival in London on 24 October 2014, three weeks before the landing of Philae on 67P/Churyumov–Gerasimenko. British science fiction author and former ESA employee Alastair Reynolds spoke about the film's message at the premiere, stating to the audience that "our distant descendants may look back to Rosetta with the same sense of admiration that we reserve for, say, Columbus or Magellan." The film's conception was the result of the BFI's inquiry to the ESA for a contribution to their celebration of science fiction, with the ESA taking the opportunity to promote the Rosetta mission through the festival.

Critical reception of the film upon its premiere was mostly positive. Tim Reyes of Universe Today complimented the titular theme of ambition in the film, stating that it "shows us the forces at work in and around ESA", and that it "might accomplish more in 7 minutes than Gravity did in 90." Ryan Wallace of The Science Times also gave praise to the film, writing, "whether you're a sci-fi fanatic, or simply an interested humble astronomer, the short clip will undoubtedly give you a new view of our solar system, and the research out there in space today."

Media coverage 
The entire mission was featured heavily in social media, with a Facebook account for the mission and both the satellite and the lander having an official Twitter account portraying a personification of both spacecraft. The hashtag "#CometLanding" gained widespread traction. A Livestream of the control centres was set up, as were multiple official and unofficial events around the world to follow Philae landing on 67P. On 23 September 2016, Vangelis released the studio album Rosetta in honour of the mission, which was used on 30 September in the "Rosetta's final hour" streaming video of the ESA Livestream event "Rosetta Grand Finale".

Gallery

See also 

 Deep Impact (spacecraft)
 Giotto (spacecraft)
 Halley Armada
 Hayabusa — successful sample-return mission to an asteroid
 List of missions to Mars
 Stardust (spacecraft)
 Timeline of Solar System exploration

References

External links 

 Rosetta website by ESA
 Rosetta news site by ESA
 Rosetta website by NASA
 Rosetta mission profile by NASA
 Rosetta mission archive at the NASA Planetary Data System

Media
 Rosetta processed image gallery on Flickr, by ESA
 Rosetta raw image gallery at ESA's Archive Image Browser
 Rosetta image gallery at ESA's Space in Images
 "Rosetta twelve-year journey in space" on YouTube, by ESA
 "Rosetta: landing on a comet" by ESA
 "Rosetta journey around the comet" on YouTube, by ESA
 "Rosetta final images" on YouTube, by ESA
 "How to land on a comet" by Fred Jansen, at TED2015
 Landing News and Comments (The New York Times; 12 November 2014)

 1
Missions to comets
Astrobiology space missions
European Space Agency space probes
Orbiters (space probe)
Space probes launched in 2004
Articles containing video clips
2004 in French Guiana
Destroyed space probes